Giovanni Pagnini was an 18th-century Maltese mathematician and hydrographer.

Works

References

See also 
Sector (instrument)

18th-century deaths
18th-century mathematicians
Hydrographers
Maltese people